FK Jildirimspor is a football club based in the  town of Resen, North Macedonia. They currently play in the OFL Resen.

History

The club was founded in 1965.

The club one time in which the remembered playing in the Macedonian Second League was named Bratstvo Resen.

External links
Club info at Macedonian Football 
Football Federation of Macedonia 

Football clubs in North Macedonia
FK Jildirimspor
Association football clubs established in 1965
1965 establishments in the Socialist Republic of Macedonia